N-Desmethylenzalutamide is a nonsteroidal antiandrogen (NSAA) and the major metabolite of enzalutamide, an NSAA which is used as a hormonal antineoplastic agent in the treatment of metastatic prostate cancer. It has similar activity to that of enzalutamide and, with enzalutamide therapy, circulates at similar concentrations to those of enzalutamide at steady state. N-Desmethylenzalutamide is formed from enzalutamide in the liver by the cytochrome P450 enzymes CYP2C8 and CYP3A4. It has a longer terminal half-life than enzalutamide (7.8 days versus 5.8 days).

References

Benzamides
Hormonal antineoplastic drugs
Human drug metabolites
Imidazolidines
Lactams
Nitriles
Nonsteroidal antiandrogens
Thioureas
Trifluoromethyl compounds